Pohick Bay Regional Park is a regional park on Pohick Bay of the Potomac River, in Fairfax County, northern Virginia.

Geography
The park is located on State Route 242, north of Mason Neck State Park. 

It is protected and operated by the NOVA Parks agency of Northern Virginia, formerly the Northern Virginia Regional Park Authority.

Water recreation
Pohick Bay Regional Park includes a boat launch; and the Pirate's Cove water park.

See also

External links
NOVA Parks.org: Pohick Bay Regional Park website

NOVA Parks
Parks in Fairfax County, Virginia
Regional parks in Virginia
Water parks in Virginia